Mary Leebody (1847–1911) was an Irish botanist, known for her work on the flora of County Londonderry and County Donegal.

Life
Mary Leebody was born in Portaferry, County Down around 1847. She is sometimes known as Mary Elizabeth Leebody, and in other sources Mary Isabella Leebody. About 1867, she married mathematician Professor John Robinson Leebody of Foyle College, Derry, living the rest of her life in the city. Leebody died in Derry 19 September 1911.

Botanical work
Known as a diligent field botanist, her work focused on Counties Antrim, Londonderry, and Donegal. Leebody's most active years were between 1893 and 1904, and was an acquaintance of Robert Lloyd Praeger. She was an active member of the Belfast Naturalists' Field Club, though she did not take up Praeger's idea of setting up a Derry Naturalists' Field Club. During the 1890s she collaborated with Praeger and Matilda Cullen Knowles, contributing material for Praeger's 1895 The Flora of the North-east of Ireland supplement.

Leebody is credited with adding a number of new Irish records, including American orchid Spiranthes romanzoffiana, in 1893, marking the beginning of her published work. Other records she published were Dryas octopetala on Muckish, Teesdalia nudicaulis on Lough Neagh, and Malaxis on Slieve Snaght.

References

20th-century Irish botanists
Botanists active in Europe
1847 births
1911 deaths
Irish women scientists
Women botanists
People from County Down
19th-century Irish botanists
20th-century British botanists
19th-century British women scientists
20th-century British women scientists
Irish women botanists